Hussainpur is a village in Shaheed Bhagat Singh Nagar district of Punjab State, India. The village is administrated by Sarpanch an elected representative of the village.

Demography 
As of 2011, Hussainpur has a total number of 232 houses and population of 1226 of which 653 include are males while 573 are females according to the report published by Census India in 2011. The literacy rate of Hussainpur is 77.24%, higher than the state average of 75.84%. The population of children under the age of 6 years is 110 which is 8.97% of total population of Hussainpur, and child sex ratio is approximately 833 as compared to Punjab state average of 846.

Most of the people are from Schedule Caste which constitutes 77.41% of total population in Hussainpur. The town does not have any Schedule Tribe population so far.

As per the report published by Census India in 2011, 628 people were engaged in work activities out of the total population of Hussainpur which includes 402 males and 226 females. According to census survey report 2011, 57.32% workers describe their work as main work and 42.68% workers are involved in Marginal activity providing livelihood for less than 6 months.

Education 
KC Engineering College and Doaba Khalsa Trust Group Of Institutions are the nearest colleges.

Transport 

See also 
List of villages in India

References

External links 
 Tourism of Punjab
 Census of Punjab
 Locality Based PINCode

Villages in Shaheed Bhagat Singh Nagar district